The New York City Department of Cultural Affairs (DCLA) is the department of the government of New York City dedicated to supporting New York City's cultural life. Among its primary missions is ensuring adequate public funding for non-profit cultural organizations throughout the five boroughs. The Department represents and serves non-profit cultural organizations involved in the visual, literary and performing arts; public-oriented science and humanities institutions including zoos, botanical gardens and historic and preservation societies; and creative artists who live and work within the City's five boroughs.

The Office of Cultural Affairs (OCA), which prefigured the contemporary DCLA, was created in 1962 by Mayor Robert F. Wagner Jr.  In 1976, the New York City Department of Cultural Affairs was established as a separate city agency, headed by the Commissioner of Cultural Affairs, who is appointed by the Mayor.

Its programs include Materials for the Arts, a large facility in Long Island City that distributes free reused supplies to arts organizations. Its regulations are compiled in Title 58 of the New York City Rules.

Commissioners

References

External links
 
 Department of Cultural Affairs in the Rules of the City of New York

Cultural Affairs